HM LST-404 was a United States Navy  that was transferred to the Royal Navy during World War II. As with many of her class, the ship was never named. Instead, she was referred to by her hull designation.

Construction
LST-404 was laid down on 27 August 1942, under Maritime Commission (MARCOM) contract, MC hull 924, by the Bethlehem-Fairfield Shipyard, Baltimore, Maryland; launched 28 October 1942; then transferred to the United Kingdom and commissioned on 16 December 1942.

Service history 
LST-404 was used to transport elements of the 179th Regimental Combat Team to "Beach Blue" during the Salerno landings in Italy, 10 September 1943.

LST-413 was able to get alongside LST-404 and take off the passengers and crew, however, eight crewmen and several POWs were killed in the torpedo explosion.  took LST-404 in tow and took her to St. Helen's Roads, Isle of Wight, and then on to Lee-on-Solent, on 16 August.

LST-404 saw no active service in the United States Navy. The tank landing ship was struck from the Navy list on 14 October 1944. She was decommissioned, returned to United States Navy custody on 21 October 1945, sold through the auspices of the State Department in November 1946, and was broken up in June 1948, at Zeebrugge.

See also 
 List of United States Navy LSTs

Notes 

Citations

Bibliography 

Online resources

External links

 

Ships built in Baltimore
1942 ships
LST-1-class tank landing ships of the Royal Navy
World War II amphibious warfare vessels of the United Kingdom
S3-M2-K2 ships
Maritime incidents in August 1944